Hal Donell Williams Jr. (born November 11, 1991), better known by his stage name Pyramid Vritra (or simply Vritra), is an American rapper and record producer from Atlanta, Georgia. He is currently based out of Los Angeles, California. He has released music under Stones Throw Records, Alpha Pup’s The Order Label, and Bad Taste Records. Aside from his solo career, he is also a member of Los Angeles-based hip hop collective Odd Future via the sub-group The Jet Age of Tomorrow (formerly The Super 3) alongside Matt Martians, and Atlanta-based hip hop collective NRK (Nobody Really Knows).

Discography

Solo 

 Studio albums
 Pyramid (2012)
 The Story of Marsha Lotus (2012)
 Indra (2014)
 Dānu (2015)
 Yellowing (2016)
 HAL (2017)
 Double Rainbow (2018)
 Felicity (2018)
 FEMME (2019)
 SONAR (2020)

 Extended plays
 Scopolomine (2012)
 Midnight Pink River Weather Grey (2013)
 Palace (2014)
 PV2 (2014)
 PV3 (2015)
 PV4 (2015)
 I Miss My Son & My Wife :( (2016)
 Tape 322 (2017)
 Floaters (2020)
 Dark Dark, High Contrast (2021)
 VOID! (2022)

 Mixtapes
 PYRAMIDVRITRA (2011)

with Odd Future 

 Studio albums
 The OF Tape Vol. 2 (2012)

 Compilations
 12 Odd Future Songs (2011)

with NRK 

 Compilations
 The NRK Compilation (2010)

with Matt Martians (as The Jet Age of Tomorrow) 

 Studio albums
 Voyager (2010)
 Journey to the 5th Echelon (2010)
 JellyFish Mentality (2013)
 God's Poop or Clouds? (2017)

 Extended plays
 Can I Hold Your Hand? (2010)
 JellyFish Mentality: Bonus EP (2013)

with Matt Martians and brandUn DeShay (as The Super D3Shay) 

 Extended plays
 The Super D3Shay (2009)

with John Harrison and BigCat 

 Extended plays
 PV X JH X BC (2015)

with Aditi 

 Studio albums
 Contact (2015)

with Caleb Stone 

 Extended plays
 Adelaide (2016)

with N01SES 

 Extended plays
 Per Capita (2016)
 PC2 (2019)

with Wilma Archer (as Wilma Vritra) 

 Studio albums
 Burd (2019)
 Grotto (2022)

with Red Bag 

 Extended plays
 PV VS RED BAG (2019)

Guest appearances

References 

Odd Future members
Rappers from Los Angeles
Stones Throw Records artists
Living people
1991 births
21st-century American rappers